RAB4B-EGLN2 readthrough (NMD candidate) is a protein that in humans is encoded by the RAB4B-EGLN2 gene.

Function

This locus represents naturally occurring read-through transcription between the neighboring RAB4B (RAB4B, member RAS oncogene family) and EGLN2 (egl nine homolog 2) genes on chromosome 19. The read-through transcript is a candidate for nonsense-mediated mRNA decay (NMD), and is thus unlikely to produce a protein product. [provided by RefSeq, Feb 2011].

References

Further reading